Coleophora rosaevorella is a moth of the family Coleophoridae. It is found in Canada, including Ontario and New Brunswick.

The larvae feed on the buds of Rosa species. They create a tubular leaf case.

References

rosaevorella
Moths of North America
Moths described in 1946